Spagic is a Universal Middleware, characterized by an innovative approach to the governance and realization of SOA solutions, which are highly modular and configurable around an OSGi (Open Service Gateway initiative) kernel.

All the actors involved in integration processes: analysts, planners, developers and managers working with Spagic; a team can model some processes and another one can define technical concepts with specific tools, such as BPMN Processes, OSGi services and connectors, BPEL, mapping, ETL.
All activities can span over organizations and geographical locations.

Spagic model enhances the features of some engines to realize a complete ESB/BPM platform and allows to compose the platform with different ESBs and it provides support for different process types, through the Eclipse  STP Intermediate Model (that is moving under the project Eclipse Mangrove): workflow orchestration of human and automatic activities, BPEL orchestration and data integration oriented services.

Spagic provides out of the box SOA/ESB and BPM capabilities to end users/developers through its graphical environment: Spagic Studio is  the Eclipse integrated development environment to define the policies, design the processes, create new services, deploy and configure the platform in different environments (test and production).

Using Spagic Studio it is possible to start with a BPMN visual tool, eventually to use specific designer (such as BPEL designer) and to manage all the developing activity (such as: WSDL generation, rules definition, mediation, custom services). 
For the management of user activities in workflow processes, an integration with Orbeon Forms is available. This feature allows the user to design complex Web forms and use them within Spagic workflow processes.

Spagic provides a web environment, Spagic Enterprise Monitoring, that allows to manage the processes, the instances and their correlation,  identify the problems, restart the processes with errors, identify the business values added by services and to support the decisions.

A project called  Eclipse eBPM has been recently created within the Eclipse foundation: this project will become the Spagic core, that will be contributed to the Eclipse foundation under the Eclipse Public License.

Released under the GNU LGPL license and EPL, Spagic is hosted by OW2 Consortium and by the Eclipse Foundation for the STP Intermediate Model.

See also
OSGi
Eclipse IDE
Eclipse Equinox
JBoss JBPM
Apache ODE

References

External links
Spagic
OW2 Consortium
OSGi Alliance
Eclipse Equinox
Orbeon Forms

Java platform software